A condiment is a supplemental food (such as a sauce or powder) that is added to some foods to impart a particular flavor, enhance their flavor, or, in some cultures, to complement the dish, but that cannot stand alone as a dish. The term condiment originally described pickled or preserved foods, but has shifted in meaning over time to include other small packaged goods such as coffee and tea. Many diverse condiments exist in various countries, regions and cultures. This list includes notable worldwide condiments.

Condiments

 
 
 
 
 
 
 
 
 
 
 
 
 
 
  
 
 
 
 
 
 
 
 
 
 
 
 
 
 
 
Disodium inosinate - umami paste
 
 
 
 
  
  , jams, and jellies 
 
 
 
 
 
 
 
 
 Harissa - North African paste of roasted red peppers, hot peppers, spices, oil, and other flavor ingredients 
 
 
 
 
 
 
 
 
 
 
 
 
 
 
 
 
 
 
 
  
 
 
 
 
 
 
 
 
 
 
 
 
 
 
 
 
 
 
 
 
 
 
 Oyster sauce

By country

Australia
 Tomato sauce
 Vegemite
 Lemon juice
 Chicken salt

Azerbaijan
 Narsharab – a pomegranate sauce

Bangladesh
 Achaar
 Chutney
 Kasundi
 Raita
 Tomato sauce

Belgium
 "Bicky" sauce – a commercial brand made from mayonnaise, white cabbage, tarragon, cucumber, onion, mustard and dextrose
 Brasil sauce – mayonnaise with pureed pineapple, tomato and spices
 Samurai sauce
 Sauce "Pickles"– a yellow vinegar based sauce with turmeric, mustard and crunchy vegetable chunks, similar to Piccalilli
 Sauce andalouse
  – A "gypsy" sauce of tomatoes, paprika and chopped bell peppers, borrowed from Germany

Canada
 Maple syrup

Chile

 Ají
 Pebre

China

 Black vinegar 
 Zhenjiang Vinegar
 Black bean sauce
 Chili crisp
 Chili oil 
 Doubanjiang 
 Duck sauce 
 Fermented bean paste 
 Ginger dressing 
 Hoisin sauce 
 Lufu 
 Mala sauce 
 Oyster sauce 
 Peanut sauce 
 Plum sauce 
 Rice vinegar 
 Sesame oil 
 Shacha sauce 
 Sichuan pepper 
 Siu haau sauce 
 Soy sauce 
 Sweet bean sauce 
 Tauco 
 XO sauce 
 Yellow soybean paste 
 Zanthoxylum ailanthoides

Costa Rica 

 Lizano sauce

France
 Cornichons
 Croutons
 Mayonnaise
 Mustard (condiment)
 Pistou

Georgia
 Ajika
 Tkemali

Germany
 Zigeuner sauce (gypsy sauce)
 Curry ketchup
 Sahnemeerretich (horseradish paste with cream)
 Kren (horseradish paste without cream)
 süßer Senf (Bavarian mustard)
 Green sauce

Ghana
 Shito
 Groundnut

Greece

 Fava
 Melitzanosalata
 Skordalia
 Taramosalata
 Tzatziki
 Tirokafteri

India

 Chammanthi podi
 Chutney
 Chyawanprash
 Coconut chutney
 Dahi chutney
 Garlic chutney
 Gulkand
 Idli podi
 Indian pickles
 Aavakaaya 
 Chhundo 
 Ginger pickle 
 Lime pickle 
 Mango pickle 
 Mixed pickle 
 Murabba 
 Oorgai 
 Pachranga 
 Indian relish
 Kerala pachadi
 Mirchi ka salan
 Ouu khatta
 Pachadi
 Perugu Pachadi
 Putnis
 Raita
 Sooth

Italy

 Alioli – a Mediterranean sauce made of garlic and olive oil
 Agliata – a garlic sauce and condiment in Italian cuisine
 Traditional balsamic vinegar of Modena
 Capuliato – a Sicilian condiment based upon dried tomatoes
 Garum – a fermented fish sauce used as a condiment. 
 Gremolata 
 Olio extravergine d'oliva
 Pesto – a sauce consisting of crushed garlic, European pine nuts, coarse salt, basil leaves, hard cheese such as Parmigiano-Reggiano (also known as Parmesan cheese) or Pecorino Sardo (cheese made from sheep's milk), all blended with olive oil.
 Saba – a condiment made from boiling down must, the grape mush left over from making wine.
 Salmoriglio
 Vincotto

Indonesia

 Acar
 Bawang goreng
 Colo-colo
 Dabu-dabu
 Kecap asin
 Kecap manis
 Krupuk
 Amplang
 Emping
 Krupuk ikan
 Kemplang
 Kripik
 Krupuk kulit
 Krupuk udang
 Rengginang
 Rempeyek
 Palm vinegar
 Peanut sauce
 Petis

 Sambal
 Sambal balado
 Sambal colo-colo
 Sambal dabu-dabu
 Sambal rica rica
 Sambal Tuktuk
 Tamarind paste
 Tauco
 Terasi

Iran

 Golpar
 Kashk
 Mast o khiar
 Sumagh
 Torshi
 Chashni

Japan

 Black vinegar
 Chili oil
 Dashi
  (served with Japanese curry)
 
 
 
 
 
 
 Miso
 Perilla
 Perilla frutescens
 Ponzu
 Rice vinegar
 Seasoned rice vinegar
 Sesame oil
 
 
 
 Sichuan pepper
 Soy sauce
 Tare sauce
 Wafu dressing
 Wasabi
 
 Zanthoxylum piperitum

Korea 

 Cheong
 Maesil-cheong
 Mogwa-cheong
 Yuja-cheong
 Honey
 Jang
 Cheonggukjang
 Doenjang
 Ganjang
 Guk-ganjang
 Eo-ganjang
 Gochujang
 Ssamjang
 Jangajji
 Jeotgal
 Gejang
 Guljeot
 Jogi-jeot
 Myeolchi-jeot
 Myeongnan-jeot
 Ojingeo-jeot
 Saeu-jeot
 Kimchi
 Baechu-kimchi
 Baek-kimchi
 Dongchimi
 Kkakdugi
 Nabak-kimchi
 Pa-kimchi
 Yeolmu-kimchi
 Mustard
 Perilla oil
 Rice vinegar
 Sesame oil

Lebanon
 Hummus

Malaysia
 Kaya (jam)
 Keropok Lekor
 Kerepek Pisang
 Pisang Salai
 Budu

Mexico

 Adobo
 Chamoy
 Mole
 Pico de gallo
 Pipian
 Salsa roja
 Salsa verde

Norway
 Lingonberry jam

Pakistan

 Dahi chutney
 Garlic chutney
 Hyderabadi pickle
 Raita

Philippines

 Agre dulce
 Atchara (pickled green papaya)
 Atcharang maasim (sour pickles)
 Atcharang labóng (pickled bamboo shoots)
 Atcharang dampalit (pickled sea purslane)
 Atcharang ubod (pickled palm hearts)
 Bagoong
 Bagoong isda (fermented fish)
 Bagoong alamang (shrimp paste)
 Banana ketchup
 Banana ketchup and mayonnaise
 UFC Catsup
 Buro (tapay, fermented rice)
 Balao-balao (fermented rice with shrimp)
 Burong isda (fermented rice with fish)
 Tinapayan (fermented rice with dried fish)
 Burong mangga (pickled mangoes)
 Burong mustasa (pickled mustard leaves)
 Chili garlic sauce (siomai sauce)
 Latik (coconut caramel)
 Lechon sauce (liver sauce)
 Manong's sauce / Fishball sauce
 Palapa
 Patis (fish sauce)
 Sarsang miso (miso tomato sauce)
 Sarsang talong (eggplant sauce)
 Sawsawan - general term for dipping sauces
 Sinamak (spiced vinegar)
 Suka Pinakurat (spiced vinegar)
 Taba ng talangka (crab paste)
 Toyomansi

Russia
 Khrenovina sauce – a spicy horseradish sauce
 Mayonnaise

Spain
 Aioli
 Salsa Romesco

Sweden

 Bostongurka – a relish with pickled gherkins, red bell pepper and onion with spices
 Brown sauce
 Dill
 Gräddfil – a type of fat fermented sour cream
 Hovmästarsås – a mustard dill sauce
 Kalix Löjrom – vendace roe 
 Ketchup
 Sweetened lingonberries – raw lingonberries stirred with sugar, served with main courses
 Rhode Island dressing – similar to Thousand Island dressing
 Skagen sauce – made with shrimp, mayonnaise, dill and lemon
 Scanian mustard – with mix of yellow and brown mustard seeds
 Smörgåskaviar – a fish roe spread
 Vanilla sauce
 Äppelmos – apple sauce, served with pork dishes and used on havregrynsgröt

Switzerland
 Aromat
 Cenovis
 Maggi Würze

Taiwan
 Maqaw
 Hai Shan sauce
 Taiwanese mayonnaise
 Taiwanese sweet chili sauce

Thailand

 Nam chim
 Nam phrik (type of chili sauce)
 Nam pla (fish sauce)
 Nam man hoi (oyster sauce)

Trinidad and Tobago
 Kuchela
 Lime pepper sauce
 Mother-in-law – a pepper sauce made with scotch bonnet peppers, carrots, caralie, shado beni, garlic, onions, salt and lime juice.

United Kingdom

 Albert sauce 
 Bisto 
 Branston 
 Brown sauce 
 Cheddar sauce 
 Colman's 
 Crosse & Blackwell 
 Cumberland sauce 
 Daddies 
 Gentleman's Relish
 Halford Leicestershire Table Sauce
 Haywards  pickles
 Henderson's Relish 
 Hill, Evans & Co 
 HP Sauce 
 Keen's 
 Lemons
 Marie Rose sauce 
 Marmite 
 Mint sauce 
 Mushy peas 
 Non-brewed condiment 
 OK Sauce 
 Piccalilli 
 Pickled walnuts 
 Poacher's relish 
 Redcurrant sauce 
 Salad cream 
 Sarson's 
 Steak sauce 
 Tewkesbury mustard 
 Whisky sauce 
 Worcestershire sauce

United States
 Barbecue sauce
 Carolina style condiments
 Coleslaw
 Comeback sauce
 Cranberry sauce
 Fry sauce
 Ketchup
 Mayonnaise
 Mumbo sauce
 Mustard (condiment)
 Relish
 Peanut butter
 Ranch
 Tartar sauce

Vietnam
 Nước chấm

See also

 Cruet-stand
 Garnish
 Ketchup as a vegetable
 National Mustard Museum
 Sachet
 Salt and pepper shakers
 Seasoning
 Spice

List articles

 List of brand name condiments
 List of chutneys
 List of accompaniments to french fries
 List of food pastes
 List of mayonnaises
 List of pickled foods
 List of sauces
 List of spreads
 List of syrups

References

External links
 

 
Condiment
+Condiment